Richard Wexler is a noted child welfare advocate and executive director of the National Coalition for Child Protection Reform,(NCCPR), an organization seeking major change in America's child protection systems, favoring family preservation, opposing excessive and inappropriate interventions, critical of inadequate or inappropriate foster care and adoptions.  In Congressional testimony, Wexler has described the group as "a nonpartisan, nonprofit child advocacy organization."

Politics
Though often critical of liberal policies in the child-protection industry, Wexler, in Congressional testimony, identified himself as a "liberal," noting the irony of his positions, which frequently put him at odds with liberals supporting, or working in, an interventionist child protection system. To establish his liberal credentials before endorsing a plan from the Bush administration, he testified in 2006:
I am a lifelong liberal Democrat, noncountercultural‑McGovernick, lapsed‑card‑carrying member of the ACLU. My [NCCPR] board members include a former director of Housing and Homelessness for the Child Welfare League of America and a former legal director of the Children's Defense Fund.

Government testimony and evidence
Addressing child welfare issues since at least the early 1990s,Wexler, Richard, "Don't Be Overzealous In Child-Abuse Cases," April 28, 1991, New York Times Wexler has testified repeatedly before Congress and state legislatures, advised the United States Senate Health Subcommittee on Children and Families, and submitted other testimony and evidence to Congress and state legislatures.

Media background and coverage
Wexler's interest in the child welfare system  originated in his 19-year work as a reporter for newspapers, public radio and public television.

Wexler's writing about the child welfare system has appeared in The New York Times, The Washington Post, the Los Angeles Times, the Chicago Tribune, and other major newspapers.

He has been interviewed by the New York Times, The Washington Post, the Los Angeles Times, the Los Angeles Daily News, Time, the Associated Press, USA Today, CBS 60 Minutes, National Public Radio, CNN, ABC's Good Morning America, NBC Today, CBS This Morning, ABC World News Tonight, the CBS Evening News, and other media.Panic in foster care; Recent tragedies could make the system more dangerous for children, Los Angeles Times

Wexler is the author of the book Wounded Innocents: The Real Victims of the War Against Child Abuse'' (Prometheus Books, 1990).

Education and academic career

His organization's website , and others, report that Wexler is a former journalist who graduated from Richmond College of the City University of New York (CUNY), and the Columbia University Graduate School of Journalism, where he was awarded the school's highest honor, a Pulitzer Traveling Fellowship.  It reports he is a former Assistant Professor of Communications of the Beaver Campus of Pennsylvania State University.

References

External links
 National Coalition for Child Protection Reform

Living people
American male journalists
Columbia University Graduate School of Journalism alumni
Year of birth missing (living people)
College of Staten Island alumni